Tarache idella is a moth of the family Noctuidae first described by William Barnes in 1905. It is found in Arizona and Texas.

The wingspan is 24–27 mm. Adults are on wing in September.

The forewing color is an orange-tinted yellow with a myriad of vertical black lines and dashes. A bright, pure orange spot occurs at the apex of the forewing. The hindwing is completely suffused with orange.

References

External links

Acontiinae
Moths described in 1905